is a Japanese football player for Thespakusatsu Gunma.

Career
Fujii joined Omiya Ardija in 2014. In 2016, he moved to Yokohama FC.

Club statistics
Updated to 23 February 2017.

References

External links
Profile at Yokohama FC

1991 births
Living people
Toyo University alumni
Association football people from Saitama Prefecture
Japanese footballers
J1 League players
J2 League players
Omiya Ardija players
Yokohama FC players
Avispa Fukuoka players
Thespakusatsu Gunma players
Association football defenders